Energy consumption is the amount of energy used.

Biology
In the body, energy consumption is part of energy homeostasis. It derived from food energy. Energy consumption in the body is a product of the basal metabolic rate and the physical activity level. The physical activity level are defined for a non-pregnant, non-lactating adult as that person's total energy expenditure (TEE) in a 24-hour period, divided by his or her basal metabolic rate (BMR):

Demographics
Topics related to energy consumption in a demographic sense are:
 World energy supply and consumption
 Domestic energy consumption
 Electric energy consumption

Effects of energy consumption 
 Environmental impact of the energy industry
 Global warming
 White's law

Reduction of energy consumption 
 Energy conservation, the practice of decreasing the quantity of energy used
 Efficient energy use

See also
 Energy efficiency
 Energy efficiency in transportation
 Electricity generation
 Energy mix
 Energy policy
 Energy transformation

References

External links

World energy consumption per capita per country